Cul-de-sac is a feature film produced by Ramin Goudarzinejad and Mahshad Torkan, Iranian human rights activists and filmmakers based in London. It premiered on 20 May 2010. The film is focused on the plight of homosexuals — in this case, lesbians — in Iran.

Overview
Kiana Firouz, an Iranian lesbian who had left Iran to avoid of getting arrested, meets Sayeh, a journalist and activist focused on Iranian human rights issues in the United Kingdom. Sayeh tries to collect some information about the controversial subject of Iranian homosexuals' lives from Kiana, who had formerly tried to make an underground documentary about the suffering of lesbians in Iran. The story develops the relationship between Kiana and Sayeh against the background of recent uprisings in Iran and the series of incidents that led Kiana to collaborate with the opposition and eventually resulted in her claim of asylum in the United Kingdom.

Reception
The film was largely well received by critics.

References

External links
 
 

2010 films
2010s Persian-language films
2010 documentary films
British documentary films
British LGBT-related films
Documentary films about lesbians
LGBT rights in Iran
Documentary films about Iran
2010 LGBT-related films
2010s British films